"Jossu" is a song by Finnish rapper Cheek featuring reggae artist Jukka Poika. The song serves as the first single from Cheek's tenth studio album Kuka muu muka, released on 20 September 2013. The chorus of "Jossu" samples a 1994 Taikapeili song "Jos sulla on toinen". A music video, directed by Hannu Aukia, was uploaded to YouTube on 1 June 2013.

Charts

References

2013 songs
2013 singles
Cheek (rapper) songs
Finnish-language songs